Sir Edward John Poynter, 1st Baronet  (20 March 183626 July 1919) was an English painter, designer, and draughtsman, who served as President of the Royal Academy.

Life

Poynter was the son of architect Ambrose Poynter. He was born in Paris, France, though his parents returned to Britain soon after his birth. He was educated at Brighton College and Ipswich School, but left school early for reasons of ill health, spending winters in Madeira and Rome. In 1853, he met Frederick Leighton in Rome, who made a great impression on the 17-year-old Poynter.  On his return to London he studied at Leigh's Academy in Newman Street and the Royal Academy Schools, before going to Paris to study in the studio of the classicist painter Charles Gleyre where James McNeill Whistler and George du Maurier were fellow-students.

In 1866 Poynter married the famous beauty Agnes MacDonald, daughter of the Rev. G. B. MacDonald of Wolverhampton, and they had three children. Her sister Georgiana married the artist Edward Burne-Jones; her sister Alice was the mother of writer Rudyard Kipling; and her sister Louisa was the mother of three-times Prime Minister of the United Kingdom Stanley Baldwin.

Poynter's sister Clara Bell became a noted translator of literary and scientific works.

Career
He became best known for his large historical paintings such as Israel in Egypt (1867; Guildhall Art Gallery, London), followed by St George for England (1869), a mosaic for the Central Lobby of the Palace of Westminster, depicting St George and the Dragon and perhaps culminating with The visit of the Queen of Sheba to King Solomon (1884–90; Art Gallery of New South Wales, Sydney). He was admitted as an associate of the Royal Academy in 1869.

Poynter held a number of official posts: he was the first Slade Professor at University College London from 1871 to 1875, principal of the National Art Training School from 1875 to 1881 and director of the National Gallery from 1894 to 1904 (overseeing the opening of the Tate Gallery). He became a full Royal Academician in 1876. In 1896, on the death of Sir John Millais, Poynter was elected President of the Academy. He received a knighthood in the same year and an honorary degree from Cambridge University in 1898. It was announced that he would receive a baronetcy in the 1902 Coronation Honours list published on 26 June 1902 for the (subsequently postponed) coronation of King Edward VII, and on 24 July 1902 he was created a Baronet, of Albert Gate, in the city of Westminster, in the county of London.

Poynter's old school, Brighton College, held an exhibition of Poynter's paintings and drawings entitled Life at Arms Length in its Burstow Gallery in November–December 1995.

Works

Paintings

Written works

 with Buxton, H. J. Wilmot (co-author)
 with Percy Head (co-author)

References

Citations

Sources

 Calinski, Tobias (2021): Edward J. Poynter "Lesbia and her Sparrow", in: Catull in Bild und Ton, WBG Darmstadt, 223-261

External links

 
Edward Poynter online (ArtCyclopedia)
Edward Poynter – biography and paintings (artmagick.com)
Edward Poynter – biography and paintings (Art Renewal Center)
Poynter, Edward John, Sir (Dictionary of Art Historians)
Pears Soap Company & Sir Edward Poynter – "At Low Tide" ("Art of the Print")
 
  

1836 births
1919 deaths
19th-century English painters
20th-century English painters
Baronets in the Baronetage of the United Kingdom
British curators
British draughtsmen
English male painters
Royal Academicians
Knights Bachelor
Knights Grand Cross of the Royal Victorian Order
People educated at Brighton College
People educated at Ipswich School
Artists' Rifles soldiers
Directors of the National Gallery, London
Academics of the Slade School of Fine Art
Painters from London
Alumni of the Heatherley School of Fine Art
19th-century English male artists
19th-century British businesspeople
20th-century English male artists